Iliza Shlesinger: Elder Millennial is a 2018 American stand-up comedy film directed by Steve Paley and written by and starring Iliza Shlesinger, Iliza Shlesinger's fourth stand-up comedy special for Netflix, following War Paint from 2013, Freezing Hot from 2015 and Confirmed Kills from 2016. In Elder Millennial, Iliza talks about life at age 35 and more. It was released on July 24, 2018, on Netflix.

References

External links
 
 
 

2018 films
2018 comedy films
American comedy films
Netflix specials
Stand-up comedy concert films
2010s English-language films
2010s American films